Retrophyllum minus, the bois bouchon, is a species of conifer in the family Podocarpaceae. It is endemic to New Caledonia.

It is a sparsely branched small tree with a flared trunk which tapers towards the top and has rough bark. It produces pear-shaped fruits that are dark-red when mature.

The species occurs near rivers and lakes of the Plaine des Lakes in the south of Grande Terre. It is a rheophyte (grows in running water), the only such conifer known. 

It is threatened by habitat loss to mining and wildfire.

References

Podocarpaceae
Endangered plants
Endemic flora of New Caledonia
Trees of New Caledonia
Taxa named by Élie-Abel Carrière